In mathematics, a differentiable manifold (also differential manifold) is a type of manifold that is locally similar enough to a vector space to allow one to apply calculus. Any manifold can be described by a collection of charts (atlas). One may then apply ideas from calculus while working within the individual charts, since each chart lies within a vector space to which the usual rules of calculus apply. If the charts are suitably compatible (namely, the transition from one chart to another is differentiable), then computations done in one chart are valid in any other differentiable chart.

In formal terms, a differentiable manifold is a topological manifold with a globally defined differential structure. Any topological manifold can be given a differential structure locally by using the homeomorphisms in its atlas and the standard differential structure on a vector space. To induce a global differential structure on the local coordinate systems induced by the homeomorphisms, their compositions on chart intersections in the atlas must be differentiable functions on the corresponding vector space. In other words, where the domains of charts overlap, the coordinates defined by each chart are required to be differentiable with respect to the coordinates defined by every chart in the atlas. The maps that relate the coordinates defined by the various charts to one another are called transition maps.

The ability to define such a local differential structure on an abstract space allows one to extend the definition of differentiability to spaces without global coordinate systems. A locally differential structure allows one to define the globally differentiable tangent space, differentiable functions, and differentiable tensor and vector fields.

Differentiable manifolds are very important in physics. Special kinds of differentiable manifolds form the basis for physical theories such as classical mechanics, general relativity, and Yang–Mills theory. It is possible to develop a calculus for differentiable manifolds. This leads to such mathematical machinery as the exterior calculus. The study of calculus on differentiable manifolds is known as differential geometry.

"Differentiability" of a manifold has been given several meanings, including: continuously differentiable, k-times differentiable, smooth (which itself has many meanings), and analytic.

History 

The emergence of differential geometry as a distinct discipline is generally credited to Carl Friedrich Gauss and Bernhard Riemann. Riemann first described manifolds in his famous habilitation lecture before the faculty at Göttingen. He motivated the idea of a manifold by an intuitive process of varying a given object in a new direction, and presciently described the role of coordinate systems and charts in subsequent formal developments:
 Having constructed the notion of a manifoldness of n dimensions, and found that its true character consists in the property that the determination of position in it may be reduced to n determinations of magnitude, ... – B. Riemann

The works of physicists such as James Clerk Maxwell, and mathematicians Gregorio Ricci-Curbastro and Tullio Levi-Civita led to the development of tensor analysis and the notion of covariance, which identifies an intrinsic geometric property as one that is invariant with respect to coordinate transformations. These ideas found a key application in Albert Einstein's theory of general relativity and its underlying equivalence principle. A modern definition of a 2-dimensional manifold was given by Hermann Weyl in his 1913 book on Riemann surfaces. The widely accepted general definition of a manifold in terms of an atlas is due to Hassler Whitney.

Definition

Atlases 

Let  be a topological space.

This situation is not fully satisfactory for the following reason.

the natural domain of the right-hand side being . The same problem is found if one considers instead functions ; one is led to the reparametrization formula

at which point one can make the same observation as before.

This makes the situation quite clean: if  is differentiable, then due to the reparametrization formula, the map  is also differentiable on the region . Moreover, the derivatives of these two maps are linked to one another by the chain rule.

Formally, the word "differentiable" is somewhat ambiguous, as it is taken to mean different things by different authors; sometimes it means the existence of first derivatives, sometimes the existence of continuous first derivatives, and sometimes the existence of infinitely many derivatives. The following gives a formal definition of various (nonambiguous) meanings of "differentiable atlas". Generally, "differentiable" will be used as a catch-all term including all of these possibilities, provided .

Given a differentiable atlas on a topological space, one says that a chart is differentiably compatible with the atlas, or differentiable relative to the given atlas, if the inclusion of the chart into the collection of charts comprising the given differentiable atlas results in a differentiable atlas. A differentiable atlas determines a maximal differentiable atlas, consisting of all charts which are differentiably compatible with the given atlas. A maximal atlas is always very large. For instance, given any chart in a maximal atlas, its restriction to an arbitrary open subset of its domain will also be contained in the maximal atlas. A maximal smooth atlas is also known as a smooth structure; a maximal holomorphic atlas is also known as a complex structure.

An alternative but equivalent definition, avoiding the direct use of maximal atlases, is to consider equivalence classes of differentiable atlases, in which two differentiable atlases are considered equivalent if every chart of one atlas is differentiably compatible with the other atlas. Informally, what this means is that in dealing with a smooth manifold, one can work with a single differentiable atlas, consisting of only a few charts, with the implicit understanding that many other charts and differentiable atlases are equally legitimate.

According to the invariance of domain, each connected component of a topological space which has a differentiable atlas has a well-defined dimension . This causes a small ambiguity in the case of a holomorphic atlas, since the corresponding dimension will be one-half of the value of its dimension when considered as an analytic, smooth, or  atlas. For this reason, one refers separately to the "real" and "complex" dimension of a topological space with a holomorphic atlas.

Manifolds 

Much of the basic theory can be developed without the need for the Hausdorff and second countability conditions, although they are vital for much of the advanced theory. They are essentially equivalent to the general existence of bump functions and partitions of unity, both of which are used ubiquitously.

The notion of a  manifold is identical to that of a topological manifold. However, there is a notable distinction to be made. Given a topological space, it is meaningful to ask whether or not it is a topological manifold. By contrast, it is not meaningful to ask whether or not a given topological space is (for instance) a smooth manifold, since the notion of a smooth manifold requires the specification of a smooth atlas, which is an additional structure. It could, however, be meaningful to say that a certain topological space cannot be given the structure of a smooth manifold.

Patching together Euclidean pieces to form a manifold 

One can reverse-engineer the above definitions to obtain one perspective on the construction of manifolds. The idea is to start with the images of the charts and the transition maps, and to construct the manifold purely from this data. As in the above discussion, we use the "smooth" context but everything works just as well in other settings.

Suppose that  is the identity map, that  is the identity map, and that  is the identity map. Then define an equivalence relation on the disjoint union  by declaring  to be equivalent to  With some technical work, one can show that the set of equivalence classes can naturally be given a topological structure, and that the charts used in doing so form a smooth atlas. For the patching together the analytic structures(subset), see analytic varieties.

Differentiable functions 

A real valued function f on an n-dimensional differentiable manifold M is called differentiable at a point  if it is differentiable in any coordinate chart defined around p.

In general, there will be many available charts; however, the definition of differentiability does not depend on the choice of chart at p. It follows from the chain rule applied to the transition functions between one chart and another that if f is differentiable in any particular chart at p, then it is differentiable in all charts at p. Analogous considerations apply to defining Ck functions, smooth functions, and analytic functions.

Differentiation of functions 

There are various ways to define the derivative of a function on a differentiable manifold, the most fundamental of which is the directional derivative. The definition of the directional derivative is complicated by the fact that a manifold will lack a suitable affine structure with which to define vectors. Therefore, the directional derivative looks at curves in the manifold instead of vectors.

Directional differentiation 

Given a real valued function f on an n dimensional differentiable manifold M, the directional derivative of f at a point p in M is defined as follows. Then the directional derivative of f at p along γ is

If γ1 and γ2 are two curves such that , and in any coordinate chart ,

then, by the chain rule, f has the same directional derivative at p along γ1 as along γ2. This means that the directional derivative depends only on the tangent vector of the curve at p. Thus, the more abstract definition of directional differentiation adapted to the case of differentiable manifolds ultimately captures the intuitive features of directional differentiation in an affine space.

Tangent vector and the differential 

Therefore,

in every coordinate chart .  Therefore, the equivalence classes are curves through p with a prescribed velocity vector at p. The collection of all tangent vectors at p forms a vector space: the tangent space to M at p, denoted TpM.

If X is a tangent vector at p and f a differentiable function defined near p, then differentiating f along any curve in the equivalence class defining X gives a well-defined directional derivative along X:

Once again, the chain rule establishes that this is independent of the freedom in selecting γ from the equivalence class, since any curve with the same first order contact will yield the same directional derivative.

If the function f is fixed, then the mapping

is a linear functional on the tangent space. This linear functional is often denoted by df(p) and is called the differential of f at p:

Definition of tangent space and differentiation in local coordinates 

Let  be a topological -manifold with a smooth atlas  Given  let  denote  A "tangent vector at " is a mapping  here denoted  such that

for all  Let the collection of tangent vectors at  be denoted by  Given a smooth function , define  by sending a tangent vector  to the number given by

which due to the chain rule and the constraint in the definition of a tangent vector does not depend on the choice of 

One can check that  naturally has the structure of a -dimensional real vector space, and that with this structure,  is a linear map.

The above formal definitions correspond precisely to a more informal notation which appears often in textbooks, specifically
  and 
With the idea of the formal definitions understood, this shorthand notation is, for most purposes, much easier to work with.

Partitions of unity 

One of the topological features of the sheaf of differentiable functions on a differentiable manifold is that it admits partitions of unity. This distinguishes the differential structure on a manifold from stronger structures (such as analytic and holomorphic structures) that in general fail to have partitions of unity.

Suppose that M is a manifold of class Ck, where . Let {Uα} be an open covering of M. Then a partition of unity subordinate to the cover {Uα} is a collection of real-valued Ck functions φi on M satisfying the following conditions:
 The supports of the φi are compact and locally finite;
 The support of φi is completely contained in Uα for some α;
 The φi sum to one at each point of M: 
(Note that this last condition is actually a finite sum at each point because of the local finiteness of the supports of the φi.)

Every open covering of a Ck manifold M has a Ck partition of unity. This allows for certain constructions from the topology of Ck functions on Rn to be carried over to the category of differentiable manifolds. In particular, it is possible to discuss integration by choosing a partition of unity subordinate to a particular coordinate atlas, and carrying out the integration in each chart of Rn. Partitions of unity therefore allow for certain other kinds of function spaces to be considered: for instance Lp spaces, Sobolev spaces, and other kinds of spaces that require integration.

Differentiability of mappings between manifolds 

Suppose M and N are two differentiable manifolds with dimensions m and n, respectively, and f is a function from M to N. Since differentiable manifolds are topological spaces we know what it means for f to be continuous. But what does "f is " mean for ? We know what that means when f is a function between Euclidean spaces, so if we compose f with a chart of M and a chart of N such that we get a map that goes from Euclidean space to M to N to Euclidean space we know what it means for that map to be . Once again, the chain rule guarantees that the idea of differentiability does not depend on which charts of the atlases on M and N are selected. However, defining the derivative itself is more subtle. If M or N is itself already a Euclidean space, then we don't need a chart to map it to one.

Bundles

Tangent bundle 

The tangent space of a point consists of the possible directional derivatives at that point, and has the same dimension n as does the manifold.  For a set of (non-singular) coordinates xk local to the point, the coordinate derivatives  define a holonomic basis of the tangent space. The collection of tangent spaces at all points can in turn be made into a manifold, the tangent bundle, whose dimension is 2n. The tangent bundle is where tangent vectors lie, and is itself a differentiable manifold. The Lagrangian is a function on the tangent bundle. One can also define the tangent bundle as the bundle of 1-jets from R (the real line) to M.

The transition maps on this atlas are defined from the transition maps on the original manifold, and retain the original differentiability class.

Cotangent bundle 

The dual space of a vector space is the set of real valued linear functions on the vector space. The cotangent space at a point is the dual of the tangent space at that point and the elements are referred to as cotangent vectors; the cotangent bundle is the collection of all cotangent vectors, along with the natural differentiable manifold structure.

Like the tangent bundle, the cotangent bundle is again a differentiable manifold. The Hamiltonian is a scalar on the cotangent bundle. The total space of a cotangent bundle has the structure of a symplectic manifold. Cotangent vectors are sometimes called covectors.  One can also define the cotangent bundle as the bundle of 1-jets of functions from M to R.

Elements of the cotangent space can be thought of as infinitesimal displacements: if f is a differentiable function we can define at each point p a cotangent vector dfp, which sends a tangent vector Xp to the derivative of f associated with Xp. However, not every covector field can be expressed this way.  Those that can are referred to as exact differentials. For a given set of local coordinates xk, the differentials dx form a basis of the cotangent space at p.

Tensor bundle 

The tensor bundle is the direct sum of all tensor products of the tangent bundle and the cotangent bundle. Each element of the bundle is a tensor field, which can act as a multilinear operator on vector fields, or on other tensor fields.

The tensor bundle is not a differentiable manifold in the traditional sense, since it is infinite dimensional. It is however an algebra over the ring of scalar functions. Each tensor is characterized by its ranks, which indicate how many tangent and cotangent factors it has. Sometimes these ranks are referred to as covariant and contravariant ranks, signifying tangent and cotangent ranks, respectively.

Frame bundle 

A frame (or, in more precise terms, a tangent frame), is an ordered basis of particular tangent space. Likewise, a tangent frame is a linear isomorphism of Rn to this tangent space. A moving tangent frame is an ordered list of vector fields that give a basis at every point of their domain.  One may also regard a moving frame as a section of the frame bundle F(M), a  principal bundle made up of the set of all frames over M. The frame bundle is useful because tensor fields on M can be regarded as equivariant vector-valued functions on F(M).

Jet bundles 

On a manifold that is sufficiently smooth, various kinds of jet bundles can also be considered. The (first-order) tangent bundle of a manifold is the collection of curves in the manifold modulo the equivalence relation of first-order contact. By analogy, the k-th order tangent bundle is the collection of curves modulo the relation of k-th order contact. Likewise, the cotangent bundle is the bundle of 1-jets of functions on the manifold: the k-jet bundle is the bundle of their k-jets. These and other examples of the general idea of jet bundles play a significant role in the study of differential operators on manifolds.

The notion of a frame also generalizes to the case of higher-order jets. Define a k-th order frame to be the k-jet of a diffeomorphism from Rn to M. The collection of all k-th order frames, Fk(M), is a principal Gk bundle over M, where Gk is the group of k-jets; i.e., the group made up of k-jets of diffeomorphisms of Rn that fix the origin. Note that  is naturally isomorphic to G1, and a subgroup of every Gk, . In particular, a section of F2(M) gives the frame components of a connection on M. Thus, the quotient bundle  is the bundle of symmetric linear connections over M.

Calculus on manifolds 

Many of the techniques from multivariate calculus also apply, mutatis mutandis, to differentiable manifolds. One can define the directional derivative of a differentiable function along a tangent vector to the manifold, for instance, and this leads to a means of generalizing the total derivative of a function: the differential. From the perspective of calculus, the derivative of a function on a manifold behaves in much the same way as the ordinary derivative of a function defined on a Euclidean space, at least locally. For example, there are versions of the implicit and inverse function theorems for such functions.

There are, however, important differences in the calculus of vector fields (and tensor fields in general). In brief, the directional derivative of a vector field is not well-defined, or at least not defined in a straightforward manner. Several generalizations of the derivative of a vector field (or tensor field) do exist, and capture certain formal features of differentiation in Euclidean spaces. The chief among these are:
 The Lie derivative, which is uniquely defined by the differential structure, but fails to satisfy some of the usual features of directional differentiation.
 An affine connection, which is not uniquely defined, but generalizes in a more complete manner the features of ordinary directional differentiation.  Because an affine connection is not unique, it is an additional piece of data that must be specified on the manifold.

Ideas from integral calculus also carry over to differential manifolds. These are naturally expressed in the language of exterior calculus and differential forms. The fundamental theorems of integral calculus in several variables—namely Green's theorem, the divergence theorem, and Stokes' theorem—generalize to a theorem (also called Stokes' theorem) relating the exterior derivative and integration over submanifolds.

Differential calculus of functions 

Differentiable functions between two manifolds are needed in order to formulate suitable notions of submanifolds, and other related concepts. If  is a differentiable function from a differentiable manifold M of dimension m to another differentiable manifold N of dimension n, then the differential of f is a mapping . It is also denoted by Tf and called the tangent map. At each point of M, this is a linear transformation from one tangent space to another:

The rank of f at p is the rank of this linear transformation.

Usually the rank of a function is a pointwise property. However, if the function has maximal rank, then the rank will remain constant in a neighborhood of a point.  A differentiable function "usually" has maximal rank, in a precise sense given by Sard's theorem. Functions of maximal rank at a point are called immersions and submersions:

If f is an immersion at all points of M and is a homeomorphism onto its image, then f is an embedding. Embeddings formalize the notion of M being a submanifold of N. In general, an embedding is an immersion without self-intersections and other sorts of non-local topological irregularities.
The implicit function theorem states that if f is a submersion at p, then M is locally a product of N and Rm−n near p. In formal terms, there exist coordinates  in a neighborhood of f(p) in N, and  functions x1, ..., xm−n defined in a neighborhood of p in M such that  is a system of local coordinates of M in a neighborhood of p. Submersions form the foundation of the theory of fibrations and fibre bundles.

Lie derivative 

A Lie derivative, named after Sophus Lie, is a derivation on the algebra of tensor fields over a manifold M. The vector space of all Lie derivatives on M forms an infinite dimensional Lie algebra with respect to the Lie bracket defined by

The Lie derivatives are represented by vector fields, as infinitesimal generators of flows (active diffeomorphisms) on M. Looking at it the other way around, the group of diffeomorphisms of M has the associated Lie algebra structure, of Lie derivatives, in a way directly analogous to the Lie group theory.

Exterior calculus 

The exterior calculus allows for a generalization of the gradient, divergence and curl operators.

The bundle of differential forms, at each point, consists of all totally antisymmetric multilinear maps on the tangent space at that point. It is naturally divided into n-forms for each n at most equal to the dimension of the manifold; an n-form is an n-variable form, also called a form of degree n. The 1-forms are the cotangent vectors, while the 0-forms are just scalar functions. In general, an n-form is a tensor with cotangent rank n and tangent rank 0. But not every such tensor is a form, as a form must be antisymmetric.

Exterior derivative 

The exterior derivative is a linear operator on the graded vector space of all smooth differential forms on a smooth manifold . More precisely, if , for  the operator  maps the space  of -forms on  into the space  of -forms (if  there are no non-zero -forms on  so the map  is identically zero on -forms). 

For example, the exterior differential of a smooth function  is given in local coordinates , with associated local co-frame  by the formula : 

The exterior differential satisfies the following identity, similar to a product rule with respect to the wedge product of forms:

The exterior derivative also satisfies the identity . That is, if  is a -form then the -form  is identically vanishing. A form  such that  is called closed, while a form  such that  for some other form  is called exact. Another formulation of the identity  is that an exact form is closed.

Topology of differentiable manifolds

Relationship with topological manifolds 

Suppose that  is a topological -manifold.

If given any smooth atlas , it is easy to find a smooth atlas which defines a different smooth manifold structure on  consider a homeomorphism  which is not smooth relative to the given atlas; for instance, one can modify the identity map localized non-smooth bump. Then consider the new atlas  which is easily verified as a smooth atlas.

More briefly, one could say that two smooth atlases are equivalent if there exists a diffeomorphism  in which one smooth atlas is taken for the domain and the other smooth atlas is taken for the range.

Note that this equivalence relation is a refinement of the equivalence relation which defines a smooth manifold structure, as any two smoothly compatible atlases are also compatible in the present sense; one can take  to be the identity map.

The situation is more complicated in higher dimensions, although it isn't fully understood.
A major application of partial differential equations in differential geometry due to Simon Donaldson, in combination with results of Michael Freedman, shows that many simply-connected compact topological 4-manifolds do not admit smooth structures. A well-known particular example is the E8 manifold.
 Some topological manifolds admit many smooth structures which are not equivalent in the sense given above. This was originally discovered by John Milnor in the form of the exotic 7-spheres.

Classification 

Every one-dimensional connected smooth manifold is diffeomorphic to either  or  each with their standard smooth structures.

For a classification of smooth 2-manifolds, see surface.

The situation in three dimensions is quite a bit more complicated, and known results are more indirect. A remarkable result, proved in 2002 by methods of partial differential equations, is the geometrization conjecture, stating loosely that any compact smooth 3-manifold can be split up into different parts, each of which admits Riemannian metrics which possess many symmetries. There are also various "recognition results" for geometrizable 3-manifolds, such as Mostow rigidity and Sela's algorithm for the isomorphism problem for hyperbolic groups.

The classification of n-manifolds for n greater than three is known to be impossible, even up to homotopy equivalence. Given any finitely presented group, one can construct a closed 4-manifold having that group as fundamental group. Since there is no algorithm to decide the isomorphism problem for finitely presented groups, there is no algorithm to decide whether two 4-manifolds have the same fundamental group. Since the previously described construction results in a class of 4-manifolds that are homeomorphic if and only if their groups are isomorphic, the homeomorphism problem for 4-manifolds is undecidable. In addition, since even recognizing the trivial group is undecidable, it is not even possible in general to decide whether a manifold has trivial fundamental group, i.e. is simply connected.

Simply connected 4-manifolds have been classified up to homeomorphism by Freedman using the intersection form and Kirby–Siebenmann invariant. Smooth 4-manifold theory is known to be much more complicated, as the exotic smooth structures on R4 demonstrate.

However, the situation becomes more tractable for simply connected smooth manifolds of dimension ≥ 5, where the h-cobordism theorem can be used to reduce the classification to a classification up to homotopy equivalence, and surgery theory can be applied. This has been carried out to provide an explicit classification of simply connected 5-manifolds by Dennis Barden.

Structures on smooth manifolds

(Pseudo-)Riemannian manifolds 

A Riemannian manifold consists of a smooth manifold together with a positive-definite inner product on each of the individual tangent spaces. This collection of inner products is called the Riemannian metric, and is naturally a symmetric 2-tensor field. This "metric" identifies a natural vector space isomorphism  for each  On a Riemannian manifold one can define notions of length, volume, and angle. Any smooth manifold can be given many different Riemannian metrics.

A pseudo-Riemannian manifold is a generalization of the notion of Riemannian manifold where the inner products are allowed to have an indefinite signature, as opposed to being positive-definite; they are still required to be non-degenerate. Every smooth pseudo-Riemannian and Riemmannian manifold defines a number of associated tensor fields, such as the Riemann curvature tensor. Pseudo-Riemannian manifolds of signature  are fundamental in general relativity. Not every smooth manifold can be given a (non-Riemannian) pseudo-Riemannian structure; there are topological restrictions on doing so.

A Finsler manifold is a different generalization of a Riemannian manifold, in which the inner product is replaced with a vector norm; as such, this allows the definition of length, but not angle.

Symplectic manifolds 

A symplectic manifold is a manifold equipped with a closed, nondegenerate 2-form. This condition forces symplectic manifolds to be even-dimensional, due to the fact that skew-symmetric  matrices all have zero determinant. There are two basic examples:
 Cotangent bundles, which arise as phase spaces in Hamiltonian mechanics, are a motivating example, since they admit a natural symplectic form.
 All oriented two-dimensional Riemannian manifolds  are, in a natural way, symplectic, by defining the form  where, for any   denotes the vector such that  is an oriented -orthonormal basis of

Lie groups 

These objects often arise naturally in describing (continuous) symmetries, and they form an important source of examples of smooth manifolds.

In particular, by considering an arbitrary nonzero vector in  one can use these identifications to give a smooth non-vanishing vector field on  This shows, for instance, that no even-dimensional sphere can support a Lie group structure. The same argument shows, more generally, that every Lie group must be parallelizable.

Alternative definitions

Pseudogroups 

The notion of a pseudogroup provides a flexible generalization of atlases in order to allow a variety of different structures to be defined on manifolds in a uniform way. A pseudogroup consists of a topological space S and a collection Γ consisting of homeomorphisms from open subsets of S to other open subsets of S such that
 If , and U is an open subset of the domain of f, then the restriction f|U is also in Γ.
 If f is a homeomorphism from a union of open subsets of S, to an open subset of S, then  provided  for every i.
 For every open , the identity transformation of U is in Γ.
 If , then .
 The composition of two elements of Γ is in Γ.
These last three conditions are analogous to the definition of a group. Note that Γ need not be a group, however, since the functions are not globally defined on S. For example, the collection of all local Ck diffeomorphisms on Rn form a pseudogroup. All biholomorphisms between open sets in Cn form a pseudogroup. More examples include: orientation preserving maps of Rn, symplectomorphisms, Möbius transformations, affine transformations, and so on. Thus, a wide variety of function classes determine pseudogroups.

A differentiable manifold is then an atlas compatible with the pseudogroup of Ck functions on Rn. A complex manifold is an atlas compatible with the biholomorphic functions on open sets in Cn. And so forth. Thus, pseudogroups provide a single framework in which to describe many structures on manifolds of importance to differential geometry and topology.

Structure sheaf 

Sometimes, it can be useful to use an alternative approach to endow a manifold with a Ck-structure. Here k = 1, 2, ..., ∞, or ω for real analytic manifolds. Instead of considering coordinate charts, it is possible to start with functions defined on the manifold itself. The structure sheaf of M, denoted Ck, is a sort of functor that defines, for each open set , an algebra Ck(U) of continuous functions . A structure sheaf Ck is said to give M the structure of a Ck manifold of dimension n provided that, for any , there exists a neighborhood U of p and n functions  such that the map  is a homeomorphism onto an open set in Rn, and such that Ck|U is the pullback of the sheaf of k-times continuously differentiable functions on Rn.

Thus, the sheaf-theoretic viewpoint is that the functions on a differentiable manifold can be expressed in local coordinates as differentiable functions on Rn, and a fortiori this is sufficient to characterize the differential structure on the manifold.

Sheaves of local rings 

A similar, but more technical, approach to defining differentiable manifolds can be formulated using the notion of a ringed space. This approach is strongly influenced by the theory of schemes in algebraic geometry, but uses local rings of the germs of differentiable functions. It is especially popular in the context of complex manifolds.

We begin by describing the basic structure sheaf on Rn. If U is an open set in Rn, let
O(U) = Ck(U, R)
consist of all real-valued k-times continuously differentiable functions on U. As U varies, this determines a sheaf of rings on Rn. The stalk Op for  consists of germs of functions near p, and is an algebra over R.  In particular, this is a local ring whose unique maximal ideal consists of those functions that vanish at p. The pair  is an example of a locally ringed space: it is a topological space equipped with a sheaf whose stalks are each local rings.

In this way, differentiable manifolds can be thought of as schemes modeled on Rn. This means that  for each point , there is a neighborhood U of p, and a pair of functions , where
 f : U → f(U) ⊂ Rn is a homeomorphism onto an open set in Rn.
 f#: O|f(U) → f∗ (OM|U) is an isomorphism of sheaves.
 The localization of f# is an isomorphism of local rings
 f#f(p) : Of(p) → OM,p.

There are a number of important motivations for studying differentiable manifolds within this abstract framework. First, there is no a priori reason that the model space needs to be Rn. For example, (in particular in algebraic geometry), one could take this to be the space of complex numbers Cn equipped with the sheaf of holomorphic functions (thus arriving at the spaces of complex analytic geometry), or the sheaf of polynomials (thus arriving at the spaces of interest in complex algebraic geometry). In broader terms, this concept can be adapted for any suitable notion of a scheme (see topos theory). Second, coordinates are no longer explicitly necessary to the construction. The analog of a coordinate system is the pair , but these merely quantify the idea of local isomorphism rather than being central to the discussion (as in the case of charts and atlases).  Third, the sheaf OM is not manifestly a sheaf of functions at all. Rather, it emerges as a sheaf of functions as a consequence of the construction (via the quotients of local rings by their maximal ideals). Hence, it is a more primitive definition of the structure (see synthetic differential geometry).

A final advantage of this approach is that it allows for natural direct descriptions of many of the fundamental objects of study to differential geometry and topology.
 The cotangent space at a point is Ip/Ip2, where Ip is the maximal ideal of the stalk OM,p.
 In general, the entire cotangent bundle can be obtained by a related technique (see cotangent bundle for details).
 Taylor series (and jets) can be approached in a coordinate-independent manner using the Ip-adic filtration on OM,p.
 The tangent bundle (or more precisely its sheaf of sections) can be identified with the sheaf of morphisms of OM into the ring of dual numbers.

Generalizations 

The category of smooth manifolds with smooth maps lacks certain desirable properties, and people have tried to generalize smooth manifolds in order to rectify this. Diffeological spaces use a different notion of chart known as a "plot". Frölicher spaces and orbifolds are other attempts.

A rectifiable set generalizes the idea of a piece-wise smooth or rectifiable curve to higher dimensions; however, rectifiable sets are not in general manifolds.

Banach manifolds and Fréchet manifolds, in particular
manifolds of mappings
are infinite dimensional differentiable manifolds.

Non-commutative geometry 

For a Ck manifold M, the set of real-valued Ck functions on the manifold forms an algebra under pointwise addition and multiplication, called the algebra of scalar fields or simply the algebra of scalars. This algebra has the constant function 1 as the multiplicative identity, and is a differentiable analog of the ring of regular functions in algebraic geometry.

It is possible to reconstruct a manifold from its algebra of scalars, first as a set, but also as a topological space – this is an application of the Banach–Stone theorem, and is more formally known as the spectrum of a C*-algebra. First, there is a one-to-one correspondence between the points of M and the algebra homomorphisms , as such a homomorphism φ corresponds to a codimension one ideal in Ck(M) (namely the kernel of φ), which is necessarily a maximal ideal. On the converse, every maximal ideal in this algebra is an ideal of functions vanishing at a single point, which demonstrates that MSpec (the Max Spec) of Ck(M) recovers M as a point set, though in fact it recovers M as a topological space.

One can define various geometric structures algebraically in terms of the algebra of scalars, and these definitions often generalize to algebraic geometry (interpreting rings geometrically) and operator theory (interpreting Banach spaces geometrically). For example, the tangent bundle to M can be defined as the derivations of the algebra of smooth functions on M.

This "algebraization" of a manifold (replacing a geometric object with an algebra) leads to the notion of a C*-algebra – a commutative C*-algebra being precisely the ring of scalars of a manifold, by Banach–Stone, and allows one to consider noncommutative C*-algebras as non-commutative generalizations of manifolds. This is the basis of the field of noncommutative geometry.

See also 

 Affine connection
 Atlas (topology)
 Christoffel symbols
 Introduction to the mathematics of general relativity
 List of formulas in Riemannian geometry
 Riemannian geometry
 Space (mathematics)

References

Bibliography 

 
 
 
 .
 
  .